Viktor Volodymyrovych Melnyk (born 11 August 1980) is a professional Ukrainian football defender. He has previously played for Kryvbas, Volyn Lutsk, Metalist, Obolon Kyiv, Metalurh Zaporizhzhia, Chornomorets Odesa, and Helios Kharkiv.

External links
 
 
 
 

1980 births
Living people
Footballers from Kyiv
Ukrainian footballers
Association football defenders
Ukrainian expatriate footballers
Expatriate footballers in Belarus
Ukrainian Premier League players
Ukrainian First League players
Ukrainian Second League players
FC Metalurh Zaporizhzhia players
FC Metalurh-2 Zaporizhzhia players
FC Spartak Ivano-Frankivsk players
FC Kalush players
FC Obolon-Brovar Kyiv players
FC Obolon-2 Kyiv players
FC Metalist Kharkiv players
FC Volyn Lutsk players
FC Kryvbas Kryvyi Rih players
FC Chornomorets Odesa players
FC Belshina Bobruisk players
FC Helios Kharkiv players
FC Lokomotyv Kyiv players